is a Japanese manga series by Kenji Hamaoka. An anime adaptation by Studio Deen aired on Tokyo Broadcasting System in 1998. A second anime adaptation was announced on 2014's 10th issue of Akita Shoten's Weekly Shonen Champion on January 29, 2014. The second season was aired from July 6 to December 21, 2014. A live-action series adaptation of the series premiered on TV Tokyo on April 10, 2020. The series was on hiatus due to COVID-19 but it returned in June 2020.

List of Episodes

Super Radical Gag Family (1998) 
 The Nose Hair (鼻毛な奴ら)
 German (ドイツ人)
 Take Some Nuts (あんとんナッツ)
 Daitetsu Twilight (大鉄トゥワイライト)
 Switching Schools (転校人)
 The Sinking Meat (沈む肉)
 Baruma (春巻)
 The Juston Peanut (ジャストンぴーなつ)
 Zoramu in Diapers (むつでゾーラム)
 The Gingiva Girl (歯肉女)
 Buri-chin (ぶりちん)
 The Egg Competition (卵争)
 Atsukiyu (あっきゅー)
 Dan Horror (ダンボーラー)
 New Ni-chan U-tan (新にーちゃんうーたん)
 Homeless Miao (野良ミャオ)
 Plum Star (梅星)
 Fujimaru (ふじまる)
 The Stupid Salad (馬鹿サラダ)
 Domiso (どみそ)
 The Bi-show (バイショー)
 Homeless P38 (野良P38)
 New Bombom the Moon (新ボンボンらむーん)
 The Sea of Blood (血の海)
 The Idiot (馬鹿者)
 New Homeless Miao (新・野良ミャオ)
 Shinma (しんま)
 Binjiyoutaro (便乗太郎)
 Yogore (よごれ)
 New Hetsupiri (新へっぴり)
 The Prime Boat's Song (舟盛りの歌)
 Ah... Baruma-san's Story Forever (あぁ…春巻さん物語フォーエバー)
 Run, Sujata (走れスジャータ)

Always! Super Radical Gag Family (2014) 
 Adventure Family 〜Beyond Gyotoku City〜 (アドベンチャーファミリー 〜行徳を越えて〜)
 Urayasu Meyers (浦安マイヤーズ)
 Bitter! Squid Man (辛辣!イカ男)
 Maruki Figure (マルキーフィギュア)
 My Holiday (彼はお休み)
 I'm Really Sorry (どーもすいません)
 Sure You Want to Piggyback? (便乗してもいいですか?)
 New Homeless Miao (真・野良ミャオ)
 Sweet Claw (甘い爪)
 Teru (てる)
 Wonderful, Japanese! (素晴らしき哉、日本人!)
 King Squid Story (大王イカ物語)
 Ito Story 3 (イトーストーリー3)
 Bose Detective (ボーズ探偵)
 Osment (オスメント)
 To The Distant Sky of Muta (遠い空のムタへ)
 Poseidon (ポセイドン)
 Hikaden (ヒカデン)
 Throat Wheel (ノド輪)
 Edible Briefs (食用ブリーフ)
 Umbrella Story, Casa Pass (傘ネタ、カーサ渡し)
 Toccata and Daitetsu (トッカータと大鉄)
 My Neighbor is Hanako-san (となりは花子さん)
 The Opposite Favor (賛成の反対)

Opening Themes

Super Radical Gag Family (1998) 
 Summer's Illusion (ナツノマボロシ) (1-16)
 -I'll- (17-33)

Always! Super Radical Gag Family (2014) 
 The Town of Steel (鋼の街)

References

External links 

 

1993 manga
2002 manga
2010 manga
1998 anime television series debuts
1998 Japanese television series endings
2014 anime television series debuts
2014 Japanese television series endings
Akita Shoten manga
Anime series based on manga
Shōnen manga
Studio Deen
TBS Television (Japan) original programming
Tokyo MX original programming
2020 Japanese television series debuts
TV Tokyo original programming
Japanese television dramas based on manga
Television productions suspended due to the COVID-19 pandemic
Wonderful (TV programming block)